The 2000 Southern Illinois Salukis football team represented Southern Illinois University as a member of the Gateway Football Conference during the 2000 NCAA Division I-AA football season. They were led by fourth-year head coach Jan Quarless and played their home games at McAndrew Stadium in Carbondale, Illinois. The Salukis finished the season with a 3–8 record overall and a 2–4 record in conference play.

Schedule

References

Southern Illinois
Southern Illinois Salukis football seasons
Southern Illinois Salukis football